Ben H. Mahon (April 15, 1888 – October 25, 1924) was a member of the Wisconsin State Assembly from 1916 to 1922 and the Wisconsin State Senate from the 1922 to his death in 1924.

Early life
Ben H. Mahon was born on April 15, 1888, in Liberty, Manitowoc County, Wisconsin. He attended public schools in Milwaukee and the Milwaukee Medical College.

Career
Mahon worked at circulation departments in Milwaukee newspapers. He also worked in the insurance and real estate business in Milwaukee. In 1913, he worked as a deputy state treasury agent.

Mahon was elected to the Wisconsin State Assembly in 1916 and re-elected in 1920. He represented the 1st District. In 1922, he was elected to the Wisconsin State Senate and remained a member until his death. He was a Republican.

Personal life
Mahon's brother, Thomas J. Mahon, was also a member of the Assembly.

Death
Mahon died on October 25, 1924, at his home in Milwaukee from tuberculosis. On January 22, 1925, the Senate passed a resolution for a memorial in Mahon's name.

References

People from Manitowoc County, Wisconsin
Politicians from Milwaukee
Republican Party Wisconsin state senators
Republican Party members of the Wisconsin State Assembly
1888 births
1924 deaths
20th-century American politicians
20th-century deaths from tuberculosis
Tuberculosis deaths in Wisconsin